Manon Miclette is a Canadian actress from Quebec. She is most noted for her performance in the 1996 film Love Me, Love Me Not (J'aime, j'aime pas), for which she received a Genie Award nomination for Best Supporting Actress at the 17th Genie Awards.

She also appeared in the films Le Sphinx, It's Your Turn, Laura Cadieux (C't'à ton tour, Laura Cadieux), Bittersweet Memories (Ma vie en cinémascope) and The Legacy (La Donation), and the television series Avec un grand A, Jasmine, Omertà II: La loi du silence and Catherine.

She is a 1993 graduate of the National Theatre School of Canada.

References

External links

20th-century Canadian actresses
21st-century Canadian actresses
Canadian film actresses
Canadian stage actresses
Canadian television actresses
Actresses from Quebec
French Quebecers
National Theatre School of Canada alumni
Living people
Year of birth missing (living people)